Barkis may refer to:
 Ormur people
 Challah, bread
 Barkis, (or Bergis) a Swedish bread
 a character in David Copperfield (novel)
Andrew Barkis, American politician
Marvin Barkis (born 1943), American politician
Barkis, a 1938 picture book by Clare Turlay Newberry

See also
Barki (disambiguation)